European Fireball Network is an international organization based in Central Europe (Germany and Czech Republic). Its purpose is systematic and simultaneous night observation of meteors and other nebular objects.

Description
The network was initially located at the Ondřejov Observatory, Czech Republic, after the fall of the Příbram meteorite on 7 April 1959, which was the first meteorite simultaneously observed by several stations. By 1963, the network consisted of five stations. It was later (about 1968) expanded by the installation of about 15 new stations in Germany and named the European Fireball Network.

The network currently consists of at least 34 camera stations located in Germany, Czech Republic, Belgium, Luxembourg, Switzerland, Slovakia and Austria at elevations up to 1846 m above mean sea level. Cameras at Czech stations are equipped with fisheye lenses and are directed towards the zenith. Sky recordings are made every night with a long exposure time. Quickly moving bright objects (meteors) appear as broken traces in the images, and from the exposure time, the burn time and the angular velocity of the object can be determined. An important feature of the network is the simultaneous observation of an object from several stations that allows accurate three-dimensional reconstruction of its trajectory using triangulation. The network is jointly operated by the German Aerospace Center (DLR) and the Institute of Planetary Research in Prague (Ondřejov Observatory). It produces about 10,000 images per year documenting about 1200 hours of clear sky observations. Its cameras detect about 50 large meteors per year.

The most significant observation by the network to date is the fall of the Neuschwanstein meteorite on 6 April 2002. Detailed data obtained from several stations allowed accurate reconstruction not only of the meteor path in the Earth atmosphere, but also of its orbit around the Sun. The similarity of the reconstructed orbits of the Neuschwanstein and Příbram allowed associating these meteorites to the same parent body.

See also
 Glossary of meteoritics
 List of astronomical societies

References

Astronomy in Europe
Astronomy organizations
International organizations based in Europe
International scientific organizations based in Europe
Meteorite organizations